Madison Geraldine Scott is a Canadian missing person. She disappeared on Saturday, 28 May 2011, after a birthday party she attended at Hogsback Lake, 25 kilometers southeast of Vanderhoof, British Columbia. Scott planned to spend the night camping with a friend, but her friend left during the night without Scott. Some of the last people to have left three hours later, between 3am and 4am, reported speaking with Scott and asking if she wanted a ride home. This was the last time anyone reported talking to her.

Background 
Maddy Scott was born to Eldon and Dawn Scott on April 29, 1991; she is the younger sibling of Ben and the older sibling of Georgia. She enjoyed dirt biking, figure skating, horseback riding, team sports and hanging out with her friends. Scott worked as an apprentice heavy duty mechanic with her father at MBG Logging. She was described by her brother as someone who was as comfortable in a dress as she was in work coveralls.

Personality 
Scott is described as having a vivacious, fun-loving, playful, social personality and would often do things on the spur of the moment. She would often break off engagements if she felt there was something more fun. For example, she broke off an engagement with her cousin, Cora Kelly, with a day's notice to go to the party at Hogsback Lake instead. Still, it is considered completely out of personality for her to be out of touch with family and friends for long. Scott loved to have nice things too; expensive motorbike gear was left at her campsite and she recently upgraded her iPhone before she went missing. She is also described as having a caring and affectionate personality, described by her friend Chelsea Little as "willing to give the shirt off her back" for someone in need. Scott also enjoyed performing with and for her friends in fun short amateur video productions. She was described as someone who would bring it all together. It was also reported that she focused more on social endeavours at school and though she managed the academic side of school, she wasn't too interested in academics.

Relationship status 
Scott was single at the time of her disappearance. She was on a couple of dating sites at the time. There was a guy who she was interested in for some time who was at the party on Friday night for a bit; he told her that "he just wanted to be friends". According to her father, she was a bit upset but nothing drastic. It is not known whether there was any further investigation into the guy who Scott was interested in. There was another boy who was interested in her, but according to Dawn Scott "she wasn't interested in him". According to her, he got a bit huffy in private according to only a couple of people, not a public display, and "has been put through the wringer". According to Dawn, his daughter's cell phone records indicated that she had an incoming call at 12:30 am on 28 May 2011, the night of the party, "from a young guy who we know."

Identifying characteristics 
At the time of her disappearance, Scott was a 20 year old Caucasian female of 160-180 lbs, standing five foot four, with green eyes, and a natural ginger hair color. She has numerous ear piercings and a nose piercing. At the time of her disappearance, she recently got a tattoo of a bird meant to represent a falcon on her inside left wrist.

Vehicle and personal items at time of disappearance 

Scott went to Hogsback Lake in her white 1990 Ford F150 pickup truck with Jordi Bolduc. There were a number of items which Scott took with her to the lake that remained on, in or around the vehicle after her disappearance. Many of these items were of value. Items found around the truck after her disappearance included a two-person dual-toned blue tent, sleeping bags, toiletries and costume jewelry. Items in the open bed of the truck after her disappearance included a hatchet, a cooler with wine and beer, a gas can with some gasoline and motorbike boots. Items found within her truck, which was locked, included some clothes, her purse and an expensive camera.

Numerous items were known to be missing at the time of her disappearance. These items include the clothes that she was wearing, an iPhone 4 with a robin's egg blue case and a large cluster of keys (with Ford key) on a Gothic-style lanyard.

Hogsback Lake party 
Other than Jordi Bolduc, Scott was friends with few others at the party. Spending most of her life in Vanderhoof, Scott attended Nechako Valley Secondary School, where she met Bolduc in 2007. She was new to the school; she and Scott became friends soon after she arrived, though this friendship dwindled by the time they had graduated in 2009. The party was a birthday party thrown as a yearly event by a man who was present at Hogsback. The party was advertised by a Facebook event. It was reported that there were around 50 people who attended the party.

Hogsback Lake geography 
Hogsback Lake is a lake of about 128 acres in size. It is located 26 km southeast of Vanderhoof.  Soil type in the area is mainly glacial till composed of sand, gravel and clay, with a basalt bedrock. There are three gravel pits within 10 km of Hogsback Lake, Mapes Pit, Skye Pit and Hogsback Pit. The area is a patchwork of lakes, creeks, swamps, forests and fields. The topography is composed of slightly rolling hills. Although there are no ranches within eyesight of Hogsback Lake campground, there are numerous privately owned ranches within a kilometre of the lake, some of them with houses and other structures. Some of these are cattle ranches and it is not uncommon to see horses, cows, sheep and other livestock nearby. Hogsback Lake itself is 22 feet at its deepest.

There is a single outhouse about 50 feet from where Scott was camping, accessible across a gravel lot. Depending on the weather, the lot can be noisy to walk across. There are a total of 10 campsites at Hogsback Lake, but it is known to host parties of multiple hundreds of people.

Disappearance 
Scott had attended the party with her friend Jordi Bolduc on the evening of May 27, 2011, but had retired to her tent and sleeping bag before a fight broke out around midnight and Bolduc, injured and drunk, felt compelled to leave with her new boyfriend. According to Bolduc, even though she had tried to convince Scott to leave, Scott was already in her sleeping bag and didn't want to get up, so Bolduc left her there. Bolduc came back to the campsite with her boyfriend at about 8:30 am the next morning to get Bolduc's clothes and sleeping bag before she went on her way to work. Bolduc found Scott's tent unzipped with her sleeping bags and stuff moved to the side. She said that she didn't see Scott and never reported this to anyone.

Cell phone records 
Scott and her father were texting at 11:30 pm Friday 27 May 2011. And the last activity on her phone was at about 12:30 am on Saturday 28 May 2011, when, according to Dawn, "there was an incoming call from a guy we know". Cell phone records were retrieved by RCMP, including tower pings, and they "had everything they needed". There was no record of any incoming cell phone activity after this.

Maddy's timeline

Second party 
A second party occurred in the evening of Saturday 28 May 2011 that was over twice the size of the party where Scott disappeared. Scott's sister was at the second party but didn't see Scott there and didn't want to report that she was at the party because she was underage and didn't want to get in trouble. Scott's tent was flattened at the second party and the person who flattened it was identified and questioned by RCMP, and nothing was reported to the public in regards to suspicious motives.

Investigation 
The investigation following the Maddy Scott disappearance had used more investigative tools than any other case in BC history. Police stated that they had interviewed all the party goers who were at the party the night of 27 May 2011, and reported that they had no reason to believe that anyone at the party was responsible for her disappearance. The police also reported that everyone was co-operative with taking polygraph tests. Most of the people at the party with 150 people on Saturday night also took the polygraph tests. Jordi Bolduc reported that she took the test numerous times and that at least one of those times, she said that they told her "she aced it." One thing of note about polygraph tests is that in Canada the results of polygraph tests are not actually admissible as evidence in criminal court, so it leaves the question as to what the RCMP actually used the polygraphs for. It is possible that the tests were used to put pressure on the subjects being questioned, so as to elicit a confession.

The police collected and examined all of Scott's belongings from the campsite, including her truck, tent, sleeping bag and pillow. The police also collected Bolduc's sleeping bag, pillow and pillow case, though Bolduc had collected them on the Saturday morning after the party. Bolduc had washed her pillow case but not her sleeping bag. The police found blood in Bolduc's sleeping bag which was determined to be from Bolduc's ankle. She was questioned about this blood and she was cleared after reporting that it came from when she was on a school trip years before.

The Scott family also hired a private investigator who did their own interview with Jordi Bolduc. They reported back to the Scotts that Bolduc kept asking to have her "favorite pillow" back.

Sgt Floyd of the RCMP reported "we haven't identified anyone that would have a grudge or had any reason to harm or cause Madison's disappearance". RCMP reported that there was no sign of a struggle. RCMP believe that foul play is involved.

Search effort 
The area around Hogsback lake has been searched extensively, including the lake, creeks, fields, swamps and forests surrounding the lake.  Hogsback Lake is a lake of about 128 acres in size and 22 feet at its deepest, with clear water (10+ feet visibility). The area has been searched by foot, quad, horseback, helicopter using Forward-looking infrared, divers, cadaver-dogs, boat, car and truck. There was a particularly extensive search effort in the initial days of the disappearance, with search crews walking in extended lines, hand-in-hand, checking in at 10 pm, cadaver-dogs searching and dive teams scouring the lake. The helicopter search included the use of Forward-looking infrared in the early morning hours, as the ground was cool and body heat would stand out. The helicopter search covered an area east to west between Isle Pierre and Fraser Lake, and north to south between Fort St. James and south of Sinkut Mountain (Finger Lake/Paddock Lake), totaling an area of approximately 2788.16 km2 (50 km x 71 km ellipse). The boat search included the use of side-scanning sonar.

Awareness effort 

An awareness effort has been organized by Maddy Scott's family and friends. Involving the mass distribution of posters, bumper stickers, pens and signs, the awareness campaign seeks to distribute information about who Scott is, the fact that she is missing and whom to contact if you have any information. Currently there is an advertised $100,000 reward for anyone sharing information leading to the arrest of whoever took Scott. The family and friends of Scott have put on a yearly poker ride to raise awareness, which has been a flagship event in the effort to keep awareness fresh in the public mind. And there is also a series of documentaries, including an episode of 48 Hours (almost exclusively devoted to Maddy Scott), a documentary film produced by Scottish director Steven F. Scouller, blogs, video blogs and a crime stoppers video about her disappearance.

Theories 
Numerous theories exist as to what happened to Scott. Judging from her personality described by friends and family, and how she lived with her parents and often checked in, it is highly unlikely that she ran away. Also, since there was no evidence of anything that would cause her to leave the campsite on her own, such as a flat tire, police consider it unlikely that she left on her own. Animal attack has also been considered and numerous people even reported seeing a large cougar in the area soon after her disappearance. However, the animal attack theory has been contested because of the lack of remains or sign of a struggle.

Many people have also suggested that she may be in the lake, however this theory has been proven highly unlikely as a team of professional divers explored the lake and found nothing. Also, cadaver dogs searched the perimeter of the lake during the early stages of the search and found nothing. The lake is fairly small at 128 acres and is only 22 feet at its deepest and reasonably clear, so it is not hard to search.

Foul play 
RCMP believe that foul play is involved in the disappearance of Maddy Scott. The RCMP also said that there was no sign of a struggle. It was also reported that apart from the clothes which she was wearing, the only two items missing with her are her iPhone 4 and a large bundle of keys, including a Ford key, on a Gothic style lanyard.

It is not known exactly how she left. Though, Rick Beatty from Vanderhoof Search and Rescue, said that like the RCMP, a lot of people assisting the search came to the conclusion that she must have left via vehicle because there was no evidence to indicate that she left by foot.

Since there was no sign of a struggle and Scott was able to collect her keys and cell phone before leaving, this implies that Scott was convinced to go on her own volition.

Friends or associates 
Dawn Scott mentioned that there was a guy who she was interested in romantically for some time, who was at the party for a bit. Dawn said that Maddy told her that he wasn't interested and he told Maddy that he "just wanted to be friends." It is not yet public knowledge how much effort was put into investigating this man.

Another person who is a suspect was the guy who was interested in Scott but huffy in private because she wasn't interested in him. This guy was "put through the ringer." And since Scott wasn't interested in this guy, he would have had more difficulty taking Scott without a struggle than the man who Scott was interested in.

Many people have pointed towards Jordi Bolduc as having some sort of involvement in Scott's disappearance and since Bolduc was supposed to spend the night with Scott, it is natural to suspect her. However, Bolduc took numerous polygraph tests and according to her own testimony, she "aced it." In addition to this, since she left the party with her new boyfriend Tyler, at the time she would have had to find a way to make it back to the campsite without being noticed or conspired with another person to have taken Maddy Scott. Bolduc had left with her boyfriend. It is unlikely that Bolduc had a hand to play, however, it is not yet public knowledge how much effort was put into investigating Tyler.

Another rumor suggested that Fribjon Bjornson may have been somehow involved in Scott's disappearance. The rumor started after Jordi Bolduc was interviewed on 48 Hours having said that Scott and Bjornson were involved and that he was "bad news." The rumor suggests that Scott's disappearance and Bjornson's death are related. They played on the same recreational softball team for a while, however, some effort was made by the police to investigate Bjornson and his potential relation to Scott's disappearance; and police and the victim's families don't believe there are any significant links between the two cases. Bjornson himself was murdered in 2012, in Nak'azdli.

Stranger 
It has been proposed that a stranger who wasn't at the party may have taken Scott. Considering the remoteness of Hogsback lake, and the timing of Scott's disappearance, this theory is less likely than if the abductor was at the party, even if they came back later. Jordi Bolduc did report that there were some people who arrived later in the party that she didn't know. According to the FBI, stranger abductions involving women mostly are motivated by sexual assault and are also the most likely to involve the use of a firearm. However, since Scott was allowed to take her keys and her cell phone, it is not likely she was taken at gunpoint; it is more likely she left willingly.

Israel Keyes 
Israel Keyes has been proposed as having a role in Scott's disappearance, however Keyes' MO usually included theft from his victims; nothing was known to be stolen from Scott's campsite. There were multiple items of value left behind in plain sight at Scott's campsite, including a purse, camera, gasoline, expensive motorbike equipment and liquor; this is contrary to Keyes' MO of stealing from his victims. Hogsback lake is a straight 33 hour drive from Anchorage, Alaska, where Keyes lived, and in a different country; making travel quite inconvenient for Keyes. However, a few days after Scott's disappearance, on 2 June 2011, Keyes was known to have flown from Alaska to Chicago, rented a car and drove almost 1,000 miles to Vermont with the intent of committing murder. And even without a specific victim in mind, Keyes ended up committing the double homicide of Bill and Lorraine Currier, whose bodies haven't been found. Keyes was known to be an opportunist, choosing some victims as they happened to be in a location chosen by Keyes in advance, choosing some victims by how unlikely they would be linked to him and still choosing other victims based upon how easy it seemed their bodies would be to carry. Keyes said on tape: "I would let my victims come to me...in some remote location." Keyes' last known victim, Samantha Koenig, was taken at gunpoint from behind a store counter at a coffee shop in Anchorage, where Keyes lived, in March 2012; this is contrary to his claim that he would let his victims come to him in remote areas.

Highway of Tears 
Some have suggested that Scott went missing as part of the Highway of Tears cases. However, for unknown reasons, the family has fought hard to keep her name off the list. At least two disappearances along the Highway of Tears corridor had similar circumstances, in that the women disappeared and items of value were left behind or had some similar characteristics. These women were Bonnie Marie Joseph and Anita Florence Thorne. Joseph's wallet was found with an un-cashed cheque near a lake near Fraser Lake.  Joseph was last seen hitchhiking outside of Vanderhoof. And Thorne's purse was left in her unlocked car and her cell phone and keys were among the things that went missing with her. Anita Thorne went missing in Prince George and her car was discovered near the Shelly turn-off outside of Prince George. Thorne was also described as someone who would "give the shirt off of her back" for someone in need, similar to how Scott was described by her friends.

Accident 
It has also been suggested that Scott's disappearance was the result of some misadventure, likely away from Hogsback Lake campsite.  Although an accident is a theory about her disappearance that is in the public domain, and there was drinking and fighting at the party the night of her disappearance; there is no credible report in the public domain that Scott disappeared due to an accident.

See also
List of people who disappeared
Highway of Tears

References

External links
BrainScratch Searchlight: Madison Scott's Mother Comments
The Vanishing of Madison Scott

2010s missing person cases
Missing person cases in Canada
Highway of Tears